Tinnie is an unincorporated community located in Lincoln County, New Mexico, United States. Tinnie has a post office with ZIP code 88351.

References

Unincorporated communities in Lincoln County, New Mexico
Unincorporated communities in New Mexico